Pennsylvania State Senate District 26 includes part of Delaware County. It is currently represented by Democrat Tim Kearney.

District profile
The district includes the following areas:

Senators

Recent election results

References

Pennsylvania Senate districts
Government of Chester County, Pennsylvania
Government of Delaware County, Pennsylvania